Norbert Tóth may refer to:

 Norbert Tóth (footballer) (born 1976), Hungarian football player
 Norbert Tóth (racing driver) (born 1998), Hungarian racing driver
 Norbert Tóth (basketball) (born 1986), Hungarian basketball player
 Norbert Tóth (racewalker) (born 2001), Hungarian racewalker